Kleoniki Gennadiou (died 1909) was a Greek painter and sculptor.

Life 
Kleoniki Gennadiou was born in Athens. She traveled to Italy and Munich. With her sister Elpida she published the work "Biographical Notes. Contribution to the History of Modern Greek Art", Trieste 1909. She died on March 14, 1909.  She received the Silver Prize at the 1888 Olympic Exhibition in Zappeion.

Artworks 
In London she exhibited the "Maid of Athens", inspired by the poem of Lord Byron. Her other works are also "The Church of St. George in Venice in full moon" and "Head of a Spaniard".

References 

19th-century births
Year of birth missing
1909 deaths
Artists from Athens
19th-century Greek painters
20th-century Greek painters
Athens School of Fine Arts
Greek women painters
20th-century Greek sculptors
19th-century Greek sculptors